The Georgia Southern Eagles are the athletic team(s) of Georgia Southern University (GS). The Eagles compete in the Division I Football Bowl Subdivision (FBS) (formerly I-A) and are members of the NCAA Division I Sun Belt Conference. Prior to joining the Sun Belt Conference in 2014, the Eagles were members of the Trans America Athletic Conference (presently known as the ASUN Conference) and the Southern Conference (SoCon). During their time at the Football Championship Subdivision (FCS/I-AA) level, the Eagles have won six national championships.

The only Georgia Southern teams which compete outside the Sun Belt do so in sports that are not sponsored by that conference. Women's swimming & diving competes in the Coastal Collegiate Sports Association. Rifle, a fully co-educational sport in which GS fields a women-only team, competes in the SoCon. Men's soccer will compete in the Mid-American Conference starting in the fall 2021 season, following the demise of the Sun Belt men's soccer league.

Sports sponsored

Baseball 

The baseball team is led by head coach Rodney Hennon, who is in his seventeenth year at Georgia Southern. Georgia Southern played its first year of baseball in 1933.
The team went to the College World Series in 1973 and 1990 and has appeared in 11 NCAA regionals. The team was also crowned the National Association of Intercollegiate Athletics National Champions in 1962, sweeping Portland State.

The team won the 2009 Southern Conference baseball tournament with a 7 to 3 victory over top seeded Elon and clinch its first SoCon title since 2002.  They also won the 2011 SoCon Tournament after Chris Beck pitched a complete game shutout against Samford University. They lost two games against future national champion South Carolina, losing a 2–1 decision, and NC State, coming short by three runs in a 5–2 game.

Men's basketball 

The head coach of the Georgia Southern men's basketball squad is Brian Burg. The team participated in the NCAA Division I Tournament in 1983, 1987 and 1992, and the NIT in 1988, 1989 and 2006. The first year of men's basketball at Georgia Southern was 1926, and the first year the school played in Division I was 1971.

Georgia Southern basketball player Roger Moore was the first African-American athlete to receive a scholarship in the University System of Georgia.

Football 

The head coach of the Eagles is Clay Helton. The Eagles have won six NCAA FCS (I-AA) National Championships (1985, 1986, 1989, 1990, 1999, and 2000). In addition, the Eagles have won ten Southern Conference championships (1993, 1997, 1998, 1999, 2000, 2001, 2002, 2004, 2011, and 2012) and one Sun Belt Conference championship (2014); with the Eagles' first Sun Belt title, they became only the third team, after Nevada in 1992 and Marshall in 1997, to win their conference championship in their first year at the FBS level. Home football games are played at Allen E. Paulson Stadium, known as "The Prettiest Little Stadium in America." Georgia Southern fielded its first football team in 1910; however, the sport was suspended for World War II and was not restarted until 1982.

Erk Russell 

In 1981, former University of Georgia Defensive Coordinator Erk Russell was hired to restart the football program at Georgia Southern College (as the university was called at the time), a program that had not competed in forty years. Erk Russell became America's winningest coach, leading to the Eagles to three national championships. The Eagles extended Division I's longest home win streak from 26 to 37 games, gaining distinction as the only 15–0 college team of the twentieth century. Russell's final record at Georgia Southern, after his retirement in 1989, was 83–22–1 (.788).

Erk Russell addressed the team the night before his shocking and sudden death on September 8, 2006. Georgia Southern University and thousands of friends, family, and fans gathered at Paulson Stadium to mourn the passing of Erk Russell, one of America's most exciting and successful college football coaches.

Since Russell's departure, football has continued to be prominent at Georgia Southern. Head coach Tim Stowers succeeded Russell and won the 1990 national title, while Paul Johnson added two more in 1999 and 2000 with teams led by all-time Division I rushing leader Adrian Peterson.

Beautiful Eagle Creek 

In the early 1980s, a drainage ditch that the team had to cross several times a day during football practice came to be called Beautiful Eagle Creek by popular Head Football Coach Erk Russell. When the Eagles traveled to Northern Iowa during the 1985 playoffs, Coach Russell brought along a jug of  Eagle Creek water to sprinkle on the field. The Eagles were victorious and went on to win many national championships with the help of that magical water.  Today, the jug is on display at Georgia Southern University and signs have been erected along the creek.

The Hugo Bowl 
In 1989, ESPN was to broadcast a Thursday Night Football game between the Georgia Southern Eagles and the Middle Tennessee State Blue Raiders. However, Hugo, a category 4 hurricane, was headed straight towards the coast of Georgia. At the time of landfall, Hugo ranked as the eleventh most intense hurricane to strike U.S. this century, and it delivered the highest ever recorded storm surge on the East Coast. Nevertheless, the decision was made to continue with the game. For safety purposes, an open line was kept between the press box at Paulson Stadium and the National Hurricane Center in Florida. The Eagles went on to defeat MTSU by a score of 26–0 in a game known as the Hugo Bowl.

Traditions

Nickname 
Eagles is the third nickname of Georgia Southern University. From 1924 to 1941, the nickname was the Blue Tide. After World War II, athletic teams were referred to as the Professors, as the school was a teachers college. However, in 1959, when the school was renamed Georgia Southern College, a student vote was held to determine the new mascot. Eagles was chosen over Colonels by a narrow margin.

Plain uniforms 
When the football program was revived in 1982, the school did not have a large budget and coach Erk Russell ordered solid blue helmets and asked the players to put a white strip of tape down the middle. The uniforms consisted of plain white pants and blue jerseys without names. With the subsequent success of the Eagles, the basic simple design of the uniforms has remained the same.

Notable alumni

References

External links